Lácar Lake is a lake of glacial origin in Neuquén Province, Argentina. The area around the lake is mostly uninhabited, except for the city of San Martín de los Andes on its northeastern coast. Its catchment basin comprises . Like many Andean Argentine lakes, it drains across Chile and into the Pacific Ocean, in this case via the Huahum River that flows through Huahum Pass in the Andes. As the northernmost lake on the eastern side of Andes that drains to the Pacific the lake and its catchment basin were claimed by Chile until 1902 based on an interpretation of the Boundary treaty of 1881 between Chile and Argentina. The lake, along with the smaller lake nearby, Lolog, has some sacred significance for the Mapuche people, as it features in their oral tradition as part of a creation myth.

References

External links
 World Lakes Database
 Lacar Area (YouTube video HD)

Lakes of Neuquén Province
Glacial lakes of Argentina